The 1958 United States House of Representatives elections was an election for the United States House of Representatives to elect members to serve in the 86th United States Congress. They were held for the most part on November 4, 1958, in the middle of Dwight Eisenhower's second presidential term, while Maine held theirs on September 8. There were 436 seats during these elections: 435 from the reapportionment in accordance with the 1950 census, and one seat for Alaska, the new state that would officially join the union on January 3, 1959.

The economy was suffering the Recession of 1958, which Democrats blamed on Eisenhower.  The President's Republican Party lost 48 seats in this midterm election, increasing the Democratic Party's majority to a commanding level.  Another factor which may have contributed to the Democratic gains include public consternation over the launch of Sputnik and Cold War politics.

Disappointment with the results led House Republicans to replace Minority Leader Joseph W. Martin Jr. with his deputy, Charles Halleck.

Overall results

Source: Election Statistics - Office of the Clerk

Special elections

Alabama

Alaska

Arizona

Arkansas

California

Colorado

Connecticut

Delaware

Florida

Georgia

Idaho

Illinois

Indiana

Iowa

Kansas

Kentucky

Louisiana

Maine

Maryland

Massachusetts

Michigan

Minnesota

Mississippi

Missouri

Montana

Nebraska

Nevada

New Hampshire

New Jersey

New Mexico

New York

North Carolina

North Dakota

Ohio

Oklahoma

Oregon

Pennsylvania

Rhode Island

South Carolina

South Dakota

Tennessee

Texas 

Texas eliminated its at-large district and added a new 22nd district formed from part of the Houston area 8th district.

Utah

Vermont

Virginia

Washington 

Washington redistricted its at-large seat into a 7th district formed in the Seattle suburbs designed to include the at-large incumbent Don Magnuson's residence.

West Virginia

Wisconsin

Wyoming

See also
 1958 United States elections
 1958 United States Senate elections
 1958 United States gubernatorial elections
 85th United States Congress
 86th United States Congress

Notes

References